Bilen is a surname. Notable people with the surname include:

Eren Bilen (born 2000), Turkish footballer 
İsmail Bilen (1902–1983), Turkish politician
Mario Bilen (born 1985), Croatian footballer

See also
Billen